Emmarys Diliana Pinto Peralta (born May 15, 1986 in Araure, Portuguesa State, Venezuela) is a Venezuelan model who won the Miss Intercontinental contest held in Huangshan, China on July 30, 2005. She was Miss Lara in the Miss Venezuela 2004 pageant and placed in the 10 Semifinalists.

References

External links
Miss Intercontinental official website
Miss Venezuela official website

1986 births
Living people
People from Portuguesa (state)
Venezuelan female models
21st-century Venezuelan women